Datana ministra, the yellownecked caterpillar,  is a moth of the  family Notodontidae. It is found in southern Canada and the United States east of the Rocky Mountains, in the south-west it ranges to California.

The wingspan is about 42 mm. There is one generation per year.

The larvae feed on Malus, Quercus, Betula and Salix species. Young larvae skeletonise the leaves of their host plant. Later, they feed on all of the leaf except the leaf stalk. They feed in groups. The larvae are yellowish and black striped and covered with fine, white hairs. The head is black. Full-grown larvae are about 50 mm long. Mature larvae drop to the soil to pupate underground, where they spend the winter.

Subspecies
Datana ministra ministra
Datana ministra californica Dyar, 1890

Gallery

References

Moths described in 1773
Notodontidae
Moths of North America
Taxa named by Dru Drury